The Sabah FC 2020–21 season was Sabah's third Azerbaijan Premier League season, and their fourth season in existence.

Season events
On 3 July, manager Željko Sopić left the club by mutual consent, with Vicente Gómez being appointed as the clubs new manager on 10 July to a two-year contract.

On 26 June, Sabah signed a new one-year contract with goalkeeper Saša Stamenković.

On 1 August, Ramil Sheydayev signed a new one-year contract with Sabah.

On 2 August, Sabah announced the singing of Nikola Vujadinović on a one-year contract.

On 1 September, Javid Taghiyev left Sabah after his contract was terminated by mutual consent.

On 21 September, Sabah announced the signing of Álvaro Villete on a one-year long loan deal.

On 24 December, Sabah announced the signing of Bakhtiyar Hasanalizade signed for Sabah until the end of the season.

On 29 December, Sabah announced that Moldovan midfielder, Eugeniu Cociuc, had left the club by mutual consent.

On 5 January, Sabah extended their contract with Sakir Seyidov until the summer of 2023.

On 11 January, Sabah announced the signing of Tiemoko Fofana on loan from Ilves for the remainder of the season.

On 13 January, Ozan Kökçü moved to Telstar on loan for the remainder of the season, and Abbas Aghazade left the club by mutual consent.

On 15 January. Sabah confirmed the departure of Ulysse Diallo from the club by mutual consent.

On 15 January, Sabah announced that Nikola Vujadinović had left the club by mutual consent.

On 6 February, Sabah announced the signing of Dmytro Klyots.

On 18 February, Sabah announced the signing of Zurab Ochihava.

On 11 March, Vicente Gómez left his role as Head Coach by mutual agreement, with Ramin Guliyev being placed in temporary charge. At the end of the season, Guliyev was confirmed as the clubs new Head Coach.

Squad

On loan

Transfers

In

Loans in

Out

Loans out

Released

Friendlies

Competitions

Premier League

Results summary

Results by round

Results

League table

Azerbaijan Cup

Squad statistics

Appearances and goals

|-
|colspan="14"|Players away from Sabah on loan:

|-
|colspan="14"|Players who left Sabah during the season:

|}

Goal scorers

Clean sheets

Disciplinary record

References

Sabah FC (Azerbaijan) seasons
Azerbaijani football clubs 2020–21 season